Francis Michael Turner MBE (8 August 1934 – 21 July 2015) was an English cricketer active from 1954 to 1959 who played for Leicestershire. He appeared in ten first-class matches as a right-handed batsman who bowled leg break and googly. He scored 196 runs with a highest score of 28* and took three wickets with a best performance of three for 56. Turner remained in cricket and worked for Leicestershire in administration. The club awarded him a benefit season in 1985. In 1994 he was awarded the MBE for services to cricket.

References

1934 births
2015 deaths
Members of the Order of the British Empire
English cricketers
Leicestershire cricketers
English cricket administrators